Theatre Square may refer to:

 Theatre Square, Tskhinvali, South Ossetia, Georgia
 Theatre Square (Warsaw), Poland
 Theatre square in Bydgoszcz , Poland
 Theatre Square (Moscow), Russia
 Theatre Square (Saint Petersburg), Russia
 Theatre Square (Rostov-on-Don), Russia

See also 
 Theatre in the Square, a professional theatre in Cobb County, Georgia, U.S.
 TheatreSquared, a professional theatre in Fayetteville, Arkansas, U.S.
 Theaterplatz (disambiguation), in German

Odonyms referring to a building